Love On Tour is the ongoing second concert tour by English singer-songwriter Harry Styles, in support of his second and third studio albums, Fine Line, which was released on 13 December 2019, and Harry's House, which was released on 20 May 2022. The tour consists of seven legs spreading over the course of 22 months starting on 4 September 2021 in Las Vegas, Nevada, and is set to finish on 22 July 2023 in Reggio Emilia, Italy.

After being postponed twice due to social restrictions amid the ongoing COVID-19 pandemic, the tour began on 4 September 2021 in Las Vegas, Nevada supporting Fine Line, consisting of 42 announced US dates in total. Styles later began touring internationally in June, promoting Fine Line as well as Harry's House. Love On Tour became one of the first full capacity indoor arena concert cycle to happen in the United States in the aftermath of the pandemic. The tour grossed a total of $95 million and sold 719,000 tickets from 42 shows performed in North America from September to November 2021. The tour made another $55 million and sold 638,000 tickets from the 23 shows performed in Europe from June to July 2022.

Background
On 4 November 2019, Styles announced the release of his second studio album Fine Line, which was released on 13 December 2019; the first single "Lights Up" was released on digital platforms on 11 October. During a radio interview with Capital FM on the singer announced that he would tour the world through 2020. Styles announced the album's support tour, Love On Tour on November 13, exactly a month before the album's release.

In March 2020, it was announced that the European leg would be postponed to 2021, amid the  COVID-19 pandemic. In June of the same year, Styles pushed back the North American leg of the tour, including the planned "Harryween" event, to 2021. In July 2021, it was announced that the dates for the US leg had been adjusted and would start in September 2021 instead of August. Depending on the state legislature, the event organizer required proof of COVID-19 vaccination or a negative diagnostic test within 48 hours prior to entry, in addition to wearing a mask, in order to attend Styles' show. On January 19, 2022, Styles announced European and South American tour dates.

In October 2021, during the tour, Styles held a two-day Halloween event at New York City's Madison Square Garden arena, called "Harryween Fancy Dress Party", where all concertgoers dressed in costumes, with Styles himself dressed as Dorothy Gale and a Pierrot clown. Many of the concertgoers were photographed on the scene by Vogue.

Set list
This set list is representative of the show on 3 October 2021 in New York City. It is not intended to represent all concerts for the tour.

 "Golden"
 "Carolina"
 "Adore You"
 "Only Angel"
 "She"
 "Two Ghosts / Falling"
 "Sunflower Vol. 6" 
 "To Be So Lonely"
 "Woman"
 "Cherry" 
 "Lights Up"
 "Canyon Moon" 
 "Treat People With Kindness"
 "What Makes You Beautiful"
 "Fine Line"
Encore
 "Sign of the Times"
 "Watermelon Sugar" 
 "Kiwi"

Additional notes
 Styles performed "Over the Rainbow" from The Wizard of Oz during the show in New York City on 30 October.
 Styles performed "Toxic" by Britney Spears and "Medicine" during the show in New York City on 31 October. * Styles performed Medicine during select dates throughout the tour.
 Beginning on the 11 June 2022 show in Glasgow, Styles added "Music for a Sushi Restaurant", "Daylight", "Cinema", "Keep Driving", "Matilda", "Boyfriends", "Satellite", "Late Night Talking", "Love of My Life" and "As It Was" to the set list; he removed "Carolina", "Only Angel", "She", "Two Ghosts", "Falling", "Sunflower Vol. 6", "To Be So Lonely", "Woman" and "Cherry".
 Styles performed "Hopelessly Devoted to You" from Grease during the show in Inglewood on 31 October 2022. He did so to honor Olivia Newton-John, who played the role of Sandy Olsson in the film.
 On 1 December 2022, Styles performed "Songbird" as a tribute to Christine McVie.
 Styles performed "The Horses" by Daryl Braithwaite during the show in Perth on 20 February 2023. Braithwaite joined Styles for a reprise performance during the show in Sydney on 4 March of the same year.

Tour dates

Cancelled shows

Personnel
Personnel adapted via Capital FM.

Band
 Yaffra – piano, keyboards, percussion
 Sarah Jones – drums, backing vocals
 Pauli Lovejoy – percussion, backing vocals
 Ny Oh – piano, keyboards, rhythm guitar, theremin, backing vocals
 Mitchell Rowland – lead guitar, backing vocals 
 Elin Sandberg – bass, backing vocals

Brass section
 Laura Bibbs – trumpet
 Lorren Chiodo – saxophone
 Paris Fleming – trumpet
 Kalia Vandever – trombone

Notes

References

External links
 Official website – Tour

2021 concert tours
2022 concert tours
2023 concert tours
Harry Styles concert tours
Concert tours postponed due to the COVID-19 pandemic